Maslak is one of the main business districts of Sarıyer, Istanbul, Turkey, located on the European side of the city. It was formerly an exclave of the municipality of Şişli, though being far north and actually closer to the municipalities of Sarıyer and Beşiktaş. Therefore, a legislation was approved by the Interior Commission of the Turkish Parliament on October 18, 2012, that shifted the jurisdiction of the Maslak district from Şişli to Sarıyer.

Maslak is in direct competition with the nearby Levent business district for new skyscraper projects. At the present, the tallest completed skyscraper in Maslak is the 47-floor Spine Tower which reaches a structural height of 202 meters; while the tallest skyscraper currently under construction in Maslak (as well as Istanbul and the rest of Turkey) is the Diamond of Istanbul, which comprises three centrally-connected towers, the tallest of which will have 53 floors above ground and will reach a structural height of 270 meters (thus surpassing the current tallest completed skyscraper in Istanbul, the 54-floor, 261 meters tall Istanbul Sapphire in the nearby Levent business district.) The Diamond of Istanbul will also be the first steel skyscraper in Turkey, where (as opposed to the situation in the United States) constructing with steel costs more than constructing with concrete. The reason for choosing steel was its relative strength in resisting earthquakes (Istanbul is located along the North Anatolian Fault), whereas concrete is more fire-resistant.

The stations İTÜ-Ayazağa and Atatürk Oto Sanayi of the M2 line of the Istanbul Metro serve the Maslak business district and its surrounding neighborhoods.

ITU Ayazağa Campus in Maslak 

One of the five campuses of the Istanbul Technical University, the Ayazağa Campus, is located in Maslak.

See also 
 Levent
 Bankalar Caddesi
 Istanbul International Finance Center
 List of tallest buildings in Istanbul
 List of tallest buildings in Turkey
 Architecture of Turkey

References

External links 

 Ground temperature variation with depth at different months for Maslak/Istanbul
 Maslak: Maslak Plazem
 Maslak Haberleri: Maslak Haberleri, Maslak Bilgileri
 Emporis: Skyscrapers of Maslak financial district

References and notes

Neighbourhoods of Sarıyer
Istanbul Central Business District